Sofia Mazagatos (born October 5, 1974 in Madrid) is a Spanish model, actress and TV presenter who became a minor celebrity in Spain after being awarded with the Miss Spain title in 1991.

Biography 

Mazagatos became Miss Spain 1991 at the age of 17. She was described as having perfect measurements and a sweet smile. Her victory in the Miss Spain 1991 qualified her for Miss Europe 1991. She made it to the semi-finals of the competition.

She went on to become a model that collaborated with Giorgio Armani and later created her own modeling agency with her friend, Mar Flores.

She appeared as a presenter and host of different programs and later starred on the television shows, Desayuna con alegría and A mediodía, alegría. She later became the host of La tele es tuya, mate.She began her acting career in 2000 in a Spanish TV seres called Paraíso and later appeared on Gloria Dance Academy,  Arrayán and Obsesión.

She became a mother in 2015. She became pregnant again in 2018, but had a miscarriage.

Appearance in films, television and the stage

Films

Television series

Television programmes

Theatre

References

1974 births
Living people
Spanish female models
Spanish beauty pageant winners
Spanish actresses
Miss Spain winners